Edirisinghe is a Sinhalese name that may refer to the following people:
 
Surname
Chamikara Edirisinghe (born 1991), Sri Lankan cricketer
Lakshan Edirisinghe (born 1993), Sri Lankan cricketer
Lilian Edirisinghe (1922–1993), Sri Lankan actress
Lionel Edirisinghe (1913–1988), Sri Lankan musicologist
Mercy Edirisinghe (1945/46–2014), Sri Lankan actress
Sathischandra Edirisinghe (born 1941), Sri Lankan actor
Soma Edirisinghe (1939–2015), Sri Lankan corporate executive, film producer, philanthropist and social worker
Sunil Edirisinghe (born 1949), Sri Lankan classical musician
 
Forename
Edirisinghe Senanayake (born 1970), Sri Lankan sport shooter

See also
ETI Finance (Edirisinghe Trust Investments Finance Limited)

Sinhalese surnames
Sinhalese masculine given names